Hryshkivtsi is an urban-type settlement in Berdychiv Raion, Zhytomyr Oblast, Ukraine. Its population is  According to the 2001 census, population was 4,627.

References

Urban-type settlements in Berdychiv Raion
Berdychiv Raion
Berdichevsky Uyezd